Martin George Poll,   (born 1961) is a British Church of England priest and former Royal Navy chaplain. Since 2012, he has been the Canon Chaplain of St George's Chapel, Windsor Castle, and Domestic Chaplain to the Queen. From 2010 to 2012, he was Archdeacon for the Royal Navy and Principal Anglican Chaplain of the Royal Navy Chaplaincy Services.

Early life
Poll was born in 1961 in Enfield, Greater London. He was educated at Edmonton County School, a state school in the London Borough of Enfield. He then studied English and Religious Studies at the University of Kent at Canterbury, and graduated with a Bachelor of Arts (BA) degree in 1983.

Ordained ministry

Early ministry
In 1984, Poll entered Ripon College Cuddesdon. He spent the next three years training for ordination. One of his placements during training was to the Royal Army Chaplains' Department. He did not feel that the British Army was right for him, but remained attracted to military chaplaincy.

Poll was ordained in the Church of England as a deacon in 1987 and as a priest in 1988. From 1987 to 1990, he served his curacy at John Keble Church, Mill Hill, London. It was during this time that he saw an advertisement for the Royal Navy Chaplaincy Services. He was given a tour of the service, and found that it appealed to him.

Military career
In 1990, Poll was commissioned as a military chaplain in the Royal Navy Chaplaincy Services, Royal Navy. Chaplains do not hold a rank, only "chaplain", and wear the chaplain's badge as insignia. His appointments included chaplain at HMS Raleigh (the Royal Navy's basic training facility), and chaplain at Britannia Royal Naval College (the Royal Navy's initial officer training establishment). As chaplain to the Royal Marines Commando helicopter squadrons, he served abroad in Bosnia, Northern Ireland and Norway. He then moved to HMNB Portsmouth, where he was leader of its chaplaincy team and chaplain of St Ann's Church (the base's Anglican chapel).

On 1 November 2010, Poll was promoted to Deputy Chaplain of the Fleet. As the most senior Anglican chaplain, he was also appointed Principal Anglican Chaplain and the Archdeacon for the Royal Navy. As Archdeacon, he was elected to the General Synod of the Church of England. On 11 December 2011, he was made an Honorary Canon of Portsmouth Cathedral.

On 7 August 2012, Poll stepped down as Deputy Chaplain of the Fleet; he was succeeded by Ian Wheatley. He retired from the Royal Navy on 29 October 2012.

Later ministry
Poll was installed as a Canon of Windsor on 1 October 2012. He serves as Canon Chaplain of St George's Chapel, Windsor Castle, and Chaplain to the Great Park. On 1 November 2010, Poll was appointed an Honorary Chaplain to the Queen (QHC).
June 2014, Poll was appointed Domestic Chaplain to Her Majesty the Queen (Windsor Great Park).

Personal life
Poll is married to Diana. Together they have two children: a daughter and a son.

References

 

 
 
 
 
 
 

 
  
 

1961 births
Living people
Church of England priests
20th-century English Anglican priests
21st-century English Anglican priests
Royal Navy chaplains
People from Enfield, London
People educated at Edmonton County School
Alumni of the University of Kent
Alumni of Ripon College Cuddesdon
Honorary Chaplains to the Queen
Church of England archdeacons (military)